The Harmonized Tariff Schedule of the United States (HTSUS), also referred to as the Harmonized Tariff Schedule of the United States Annotated (HTSA), is the primary resource for determining tariff (customs duties) classifications for goods imported into the United States. It can also be used in place of Schedule B for classifying goods exported from the United States to foreign countries. The Harmonized Tariff Schedule classifies a good based on its name, use, and/or the material used in its construction and assigns it a ten-digit classification code number, and there are over 17,000 unique classification code numbers. Although the U.S. International Trade Commission publishes and maintains the Schedule in its various forms, U.S. Customs and Border Protection is the only agency that can provide legally binding advice or rulings on classification of imports.

The Schedule is based on the international Harmonized System, the global system of nomenclature that is used to describe most world trade in goods, maintained by the World Customs Organization (WCO). Virtually all countries base their tariff schedules on the WCO's Harmonized System.

History
The HTS was enacted by subtitle B of title I of the Omnibus Trade and Competitiveness Act of 1988, and became effective on January 1, 1989, replacing the previous Tariff Schedules of the United States (TSUS). The United States had not adopted the previous international nomenclatures, but signed on as a member to the World Customs Organization, which created the Customs Cooperation Council (CCC) and the U.S. Customs Service—predecessor to U.S. Customs and Border Protection of the U.S. Department of Homeland Security). Such organizations helped develop the HTS throughout the 1970s.

In 1981, President Ronald Reagan requested that the U.S. International Trade Commission prepare a draft of the U.S. tariff schedules using HTS nomenclature. This conversion was issued in June 1983, and after lengthy review from interested parties, replaced the TSUS on August 23, 1988 with the enactment of the Omnibus Trade and Competitiveness Act.

Chapters 

The tariff schedule has 99 chapters under 22 sections, and various appendices for chemicals, pharmaceuticals, and intermediate chemicals for dye. Raw materials or basic substances generally appear in the early chapters and in earlier headings within a chapter, whereas highly processed goods and manufactured articles appear in later chapters and headings. For example, Section I and Section II cover animals and plants, while Sections XVI, XVII, and XVIII cover "Machinery and Mechanical Appliances", "Vehicles, Aircraft, and Vessels", and "Precision Instruments, Clocks and Watches, and Musical Instruments".

This is not a hard-and-fast rule, however; "toys" appear in Chapter 95 and "works of art" are found in Chapter 97. Chapter 77 is "reserved for possible future use".

See also 
 Harmonized Commodity Description and Coding System
 U.S. Customs and Border Protection
 United States International Trade Commission

References

External links
 United States Harmonized Tariff Schedule (HTS) - PDF file - Version: 2019 Revision 12

United States trade law
Publications of the United States government